Christopher M. Ferraro (born January 24, 1973) is an American former professional ice hockey player who formerly played in the National Hockey League. Along with his twin brother, Peter, became the second set of identical twins to play on the same NHL team: the New York Rangers in the 1995–96 season.

Playing career
As a youth, Ferraro and his brother Peter played in the 1985, 1986 and 1987 Quebec International Pee-Wee Hockey Tournaments with the Philadelphia Flyers and New York Rangers minor ice hockey teams.

Chris Ferraro was the later of the Ferraro twins to be drafted into the NHL.  He was drafted in the fourth round, 85th overall, in the 1992 NHL Entry Draft by the Rangers.  During his NHL career, he played for the Rangers, Pittsburgh Penguins, Edmonton Oilers, New York Islanders and Washington Capitals.  He also represented the United States at the World Junior Hockey Championships in 1992 and 1993, and at the World Championships in 2003.

Ferraro played in Germany with the DEG Metro Stars in the 2005–06 season before returning to the American Hockey League with the San Antonio Rampage. He joined his brother playing with the Las Vegas Wranglers for the 2007–08 season. During a March 1, 2008 game against the Victoria Salmon Kings, he was the victim of a sucker punch that knocked him unconscious and resulted in a concussion.  Ferarro pursued assault charges against his opponent, Robin Gomez, though Gomez was acquitted. Ferraro returned for the 2008–09 season for the Wranglers before ending his professional career to develop a training center for young players in Long Island.

The brothers inducted into the Suffolk Sports Hall of Fame on Long Island in the Hockey Category with the Class of 2012.

Chris and his brother Peter built the Twin Rinks facility at Nassau County's Eisenhower Park. But cost overruns led to its bankruptcy in 2015, and the Islanders purchased it to serve as their practice facility.

Personal
Chris married Jennifer, his college sweetheart from the University of Maine in 2001. Three months later, his wife was diagnosed with stomach cancer and, after a 13-month battle, died on November 5, 2002. In dedication, Chris set up the Jennifer Ferraro Foundation to help further research in stomach cancer.

Career statistics

Regular season and playoffs

International

Awards and honors

References

External links
 

1973 births
Living people
Albany River Rats players
American men's ice hockey centers
American people of Italian descent
Atlanta Knights players
Binghamton Rangers players
DEG Metro Stars players
Dubuque Fighting Saints players
Hamilton Bulldogs (AHL) players
Hartford Wolf Pack players
Ice hockey players from New York (state)
Las Vegas Wranglers players
Maine Black Bears men's ice hockey players
New York Rangers draft picks
New York Rangers players
New York Islanders players
People from Port Jefferson, New York
Phoenix RoadRunners players
Pittsburgh Penguins players
Portland Pirates players
Providence Bruins players
San Antonio Rampage players
Södertälje SK players
Springfield Falcons players
Syracuse Crunch players
American twins
Twin sportspeople
Washington Capitals players
Waterloo Black Hawks players
NCAA men's ice hockey national champions